Mandy van den Berg (born 26 August 1990) is a Dutch football defender who plays for PSV and formerly for the Netherlands national team. She formerly played club football in the Eredivisie Vrouwen for ADO Den Haag, for Vittsjö GIK of the Swedish Damallsvenskan and for LSK Kvinner FK of the Norwegian Toppserien.

Club career
After spending three seasons in Sweden with Vittsjö, Van den Berg signed for LSK Kvinner of Lillestrøm, Norway in December 2014.

LSK Kvinner secured a double in 2015, but Van den Berg left after one season to join English FA WSL club Liverpool. She played 13 times for Liverpool, who finished fifth in WSL 1, then transferred to Reading at the end of the season.

International career
Van den Berg began playing football aged six and was called up for the Netherlands Under-17 team while still at school in her native Naaldwijk. After winning 22 caps at Under-19 level, Van den Berg debuted for the senior Netherlands women's national football team on 15 December 2010. She replaced captain Daphne Koster for the second half of a 3–1 win over Mexico during a friendly tournament in Brazil.

National team coach Roger Reijners named Van den Berg in his final squad for UEFA Women's Euro 2013 in Sweden. When she suffered knee ligament damage shortly before the tournament, Merel van Dongen was called up as a late replacement.

At the 2015 FIFA Women's World Cup, Van den Berg captained the Netherlands in their first ever appearance at the World Cup finals.

Van den Berg also captained the team that won the UEFA Women's Euro 2017 tournament. She made 4 appearances for the team at the tournament; starting 2 group stage games and being used as a substitute in two knockout games. She left the national team after the European cup and did not play on the 2019 World Cup silver medalist squad.

International goals
Scores and results list the Netherlands goal tally first.

Honours

Club
ADO Den Haag
 Eredivisie (1): 2011–12
 KNVB Women's Cup (1): 2011–12

LSK Kvinner
 Toppserien (1): 2015
 Norwegian Women's Cup (1): 2015

International
Netherlands
UEFA Women's Euro (1): 2017

References

External links

Van den Berg profile on Onsoranje (in Dutch)
Van den Berg profile on women's Netherlands (in Dutch)

 

1990 births
Living people
Dutch women's footballers
Dutch expatriate sportspeople in Sweden
Dutch expatriate sportspeople in Norway
Dutch expatriate sportspeople in England
Dutch expatriate sportspeople in Spain
Expatriate women's footballers in Spain
Netherlands women's international footballers
People from Naaldwijk
Damallsvenskan players
Toppserien players
Vittsjö GIK players
LSK Kvinner FK players
Expatriate women's footballers in Norway
Expatriate women's footballers in England
Expatriate women's footballers in Sweden
2015 FIFA Women's World Cup players
Women's association football defenders
Liverpool F.C. Women players
Reading F.C. Women players
Women's Super League players
ADO Den Haag (women) players
Eredivisie (women) players
UEFA Women's Championship-winning players
Knights of the Order of Orange-Nassau
Primera División (women) players
Valencia CF Femenino players
Dutch expatriate women's footballers
PSV (women) players
Footballers from South Holland
UEFA Women's Euro 2017 players